The American Journal of Sociology is a peer-reviewed bi-monthly academic journal that publishes original research and book reviews in the field of sociology and related social sciences. It was founded in 1895 as the first journal in its discipline. The current editor is Elisabeth S. Clemens. For its entire history, the journal has been housed at the University of Chicago and published by the University of Chicago Press.

Past editors 
Past editors-in-chief of the journal have been:

From 1926 to 1933, the journal was co-edited by a number of different members of the University of Chicago faculty including Ellsworth Faris, Robert E. Park, Ernest Burgess, Fay-Cooper Cole, Marion Talbot, Frederick Starr, Edward Sapir, Louis Wirth, Eyler Simpson, Edward Webster, Edwin Sutherland, William Ogburn, Herbert Blumer, and Robert Redfield.

Abstracting and indexing
According to the Journal Citation Reports, its 2019 impact factor was 3.232, ranking it 8th out of 150 journals in the category "Sociology".

Roger V. Gould Prize 
In 2002, the American Journal of Sociology created the Roger V. Gould prize in memory of its former editor. The $1,000 prize is awarded annually at the American Sociological Association annual meeting to the paper from the previous volume of the journal that most "clearly embodies Roger’s ideals as a sociologist: clarity, rigor, and scientific ambition combined with imagination on the one hand and a sure sense of empirical interest, importance, and accuracy on the other." Winners include Peter Bearman, John Levi Martin, Michael J. Rosenfeld, Elizabeth E. Bruch, Robert D. Mare, Shelley Correll, and Roberto Garvía.

References

Further reading

External links 

 
 American Journal of Sociology at The Department of Sociology at The University of Chicago 
 American Journal of Sociology at the HathiTrust
 The American Journal of Sociology, 1896-1916

Sociology journals
University of Chicago Press academic journals
English-language journals
Bimonthly journals
Publications established in 1895